This is a list of states in the Holy Roman Empire beginning with the letter B:

References

B